Simalia boeleni is a species of python, a nonvenomous snake in the family Pythonidae. The species is endemic to the mountains of New Guinea. No subspecies are recognized. Its common names include Boelen's pythonand the black python.Etymology
The specific name, boeleni, is in honor of K.W.J. Boelen, M.D., who collected the holotype specimen.Beolens B, Watkins M, Grayson M (2011). The Eponym Dictionary of Reptiles. Baltimore: Johns Hopkins University Press. xiii + 296 pp. . (Morelia boeleni, p. 29).

Description
In S. boeleni adults, the upperside color pattern is dark bluish-black or purplish-black, and the anterior part of the underside is white to pale yellow. The white extends up the flanks as a series of streaks. The upper and lower lips are also patterned with pale or whitish labial scales. The black portions are commonly iridescent with an oil-slick-like sheen. The body is stocky and the head large. Neonates are predominantly red upon emerging from the egg. Gradual black pigmentation presents itself as the neonate grows and sheds. Ontogenetic color charge begins as the juvenile snake approaches  in length, usually around 2 years of age.

Conservation status
The unmistakable and famed Boelen's python receives the highest legal protection possible in Papua New Guinea. It is currently listed on CITES Appendix II. It is difficult to truly assess the conservation status of these snakes, as they are incredibly secretive and difficult to find in the wild.

Common names
Locally, S. boeleni is also known as the blu moran or papa graun. Within Indonesia, it has several names depending on which language is used. The common Indonesian names of this snake are sanca hitam, sanca bulan, piton hitam, and ular buleni.

Geographic rangeS. boeleni is found in Indonesia (Western New Guinea in the Paniai Lakes region) and Papua New Guinea (the provinces of Eastern Highlands, Central and Morobe, and Goodenough Island).

The type locality given is "Dimija (3[°] 56' S, 136[°] 18' E), Wissel Lakes, Dutch New Guinea, about 1750 m (5700 feet) above sea-level" [Western New Guinea, Indonesia].

It is generally encountered on the forest floor, but is also reckoned to be an able climber.

Diet
The diet of S. boeleni consists of small mammals, ground-nesting birds, and lizards.

CaptivityS. boeleni is considered to be highly desirable by private keepers due to its beauty, but is also exceptionally rare in collections. Although captive-born snakes are fairly hardy in captivity, wild-caught individuals are considerably more difficult to keep successfully. Captive breeding is exceedingly rare, and the conditions necessary are still unclear. Many specific strategies have been employed to attempt to get these rare snakes to breed.

References

Further reading
Flagle, Ari R.; Stoops, Erik D. (2009). Black python: Morelia boeleni. (Contributions to Natural History, Vol. 26). Frankfurt: Chimaira Buchhandelsgesellschaft mbh. 160 pp. .
Brongersma LD (1953). "Zoology Notes on New Guinean Reptiles and Amphibians II". Proc. Koninklijke Nederlandse Akademie van Wetenschappen, Amsterdam (Series C) 56: 317–325. (Liasis boeleni '', new species, p. 317.)

External links

Boelen's python site & forums.
Boelen's Python Site by Ari R. Flagle.

Morelia (snake)
Endemic fauna of New Guinea
Reptiles of Papua New Guinea
Reptiles of Western New Guinea
Reptiles described in 1953
Taxa named by Leo Brongersma
Snakes of New Guinea